David Bleakley (1817 – 1882) was an English first-class cricketer.

Born in Lancashire at Pilkington in 1817, Bleakley made his debut in first-class cricket for Manchester against Sheffield at Sheffield in 1852. He made a second first-class appearance for Manchester against Sheffield in 1854, with the match played at Manchester. He later appeared in three first-class matches for the Gentlemen of the North against the Gentlemen of the South in 1859–60. In his five first-class matches, Bleakley scored 68 runs at an average of 6.80, with a high score of 11. He died at Bury in 1882.

References

External links

1817 births
1882 deaths
People from Salford
English cricketers
Manchester Cricket Club cricketers
Gentlemen of the North cricketers